Pagenstecher may refer to:

People 
 Albrecht Pagenstecher (1839–1926),  German-American pioneer of the modern paper industry
 Alexander Pagenstecher (ophthalmologist) (1828–1879), German ophthalmologist
 Arnold Pagenstecher (1837–1913), German physician and entomologist
 Alexander Pagenstecher (zoologist) (1825–1889), German naturalist
 Hermann Pagenstecher (1844–1932), German ophthalmologist
 Johan David Carel Pagenstecher, German-born acting commander of the Dutch Gold Coast
 Wolfgang Pagenstecher (1880–1953), German heraldist

Animals 
 Pagenstecher's crow (Euploea doretta), a butterfly described by Arnold Pagenstecher

Surnames of German origin